ECU Health Edgecombe Hospital, formerly Heritage Hospital, is a hospital located in Tarboro, North Carolina. It is a part of the ECU Health. Edgecombe General Hospital opened as a county-owned hospital in 1916. It succeeded Pittman Hospital, which opened in 1901. In 1959, the Hill-Burton Act helped combine Edgecombe General Hospital, with three other facilities. Edgecombe County sold the hospital to Hospital Corporation of America (HCA) in 1982. HCA opened a 127-bed facility in 1985, named Heritage Hospital. UHSEC bought Heritage Hospital in 1998 from HCA. The hospitals focus is as a community hospital.  The hospital has 101 general and 16 rehabilitation hospital beds.  It has five Shared Inpatient/Ambulatory Surgery, two Endoscopy, and one C-Section operating rooms.

References

External links 
 Vidant Edgecombe Hospital

Hospital buildings completed in 1916
Hospital buildings completed in 1985
Hospitals in North Carolina
Buildings and structures in Edgecombe County, North Carolina